Grown & Sexy is the sixth studio album by American singer Babyface. It was released by Arista Records on July 26, 2005 in the United States. Originally titled A Love Story and due to be released on March 23, 2004, its release was shelved after lead single "The Loneliness" failed to attract radio airplay/sales. The album was later reworked into Grown & Sexy with three songs ("The Loneliness", "God Must Love U", "The Getting 2 Know U") being taken from the A Love Story sessions. Grown & Sexy reached number 10 on the US Billboard 200 and number 3 on the R&B/Hip-Hop Albums.

Critical reception

Grown & Sexy was met with "mixed or average" reviews from critics. At Metacritic, which assigns a weighted average rating out of 100 to reviews from mainstream publications, this release received an average score of 51 based on 9 reviews.

AllMusic editor Andy Kellman called Grown & Sexy "a back-to-basics album that sounds a lot more natural [...] While this is very familiar territory, few cover it as well [...] Grown & Sexy doesn't have any songs that immediately jump out and fall in line with the biggest hits, but it does make up for that with its consistency. Mostly light and easygoing, though not without its fair share of female-male drama (and a couple touches of humor), it's capped off by a great dancefloor track in the form of "She's International," showing that he needn't necessarily stick to ballads with acoustic guitars."

Track listing

Charts

Weekly charts

Year-end charts

References

Albums produced by the Underdogs (production team)
Albums produced by Babyface (musician)
Babyface (musician) albums
2005 albums